The Ahlul Bayt Islamic Centre is the main Shia Islamic centre in Ireland and is situated at Milltown Bridge, Dublin. It is commonly known as ‘Hussainia’ and was previously the only Shia Muslim Islamic centre and mosque in the whole of Ireland.

It aims to serve the social, cultural and spiritual needs of the entire Shia Muslim population of Ireland and it draws Shia members from throughout the country, particularly at festival times and during Muharram. At present there are about 6,000 Shias working, studying and living in Ireland.

Formation in the 1980s
It was founded by Imam Dr. Ali Al Saleh who was studying in Ireland during the 1980s, moving through several rented houses before finally getting its own building in September 1996. The centre was built from personal funds under the supervision of Ayatollah Gholamreza Hassani.

Administration and Activities
The centre's Imam is Imam Dr. Ali Al Saleh, a graduate of the Royal College of Surgeons in Ireland and a religious scholar who studied in the Hawza of Najaf, Iraq and Qum, Iran. The centre has very good relationships with many politicians and diplomats of Ireland as well as politicians and diplomats of countries abroad and also with the two other Islamic Centres of Ireland. Imam Dr. Ali Al Saleh is a member of the Irish Council of Imams, in which he represents the Shia community.

The centre is a resource for Shia Muslims in Dublin. It is an active and vibrant Islamic institution and it provides a programme every Saturday and holds daily prayers and the Jumu'ah prayer. There is evident social commitment among the community and clear efforts to support one other in developing their spiritual lives. Friday prayers are well attended, even by those living far from the Dublin area, and the community conscientiously gathers to mark the various observances set down in the Shia calendar, especially in the month of Muharram and the month of Ramadan where nearly 1500 or more people attend.

Facilities
The centre covers a large area and it includes a library, a main prayer hall, a kitchen, administrative offices and ablution areas. All of these are open to be used by the Muslim community of Ireland who come from several countries.

External links
Ahlul Bayt Islamic Centre, Ireland

Shia Islam in Ireland
Shia mosques
Mosques in the Republic of Ireland
Religious buildings and structures in Dublin (city)
Milltown, Dublin
Mosques completed in 1996
20th-century religious buildings and structures in the Republic of Ireland